Cleavage and polyadenylation specificity factor subunit 1 is a protein that in humans is encoded by the CPSF1 gene.

In most cases eukaryotic pre-messenger(m)RNA 3 prime ends are processed in two coordinated steps.  First there is a site-specific cleavage by an endonuclease and then the addition of a poly(A) tail at the 3 prime end of the 5 prime cleavage product.  Cleavage requires four multisubunit complexes, namely cleavage and polyadenylation specificity factor (CPSF), cleavage stimulation factor (CstF), cleavage factors Im and IIm (CFIm and CFIIm), along with a single subunit poly(A)polymerase (PAP). CPSF1 is the largest component of the CPSF complex composed of CPSF1, CPSF2, CPSF3, CPSF4, FIP1L1, Symplekin and WDR33 and located in the nucleus.

References

Further reading

External links